Aircraft carriers are warships that act as airbases for carrier-based aircraft. In the United States Navy, these consist of ships commissioned with hull classification symbols CV (aircraft carrier), CVA (attack aircraft carrier), CVB (large aircraft carrier), CVL (light aircraft carrier), CVN (aircraft carrier (nuclear propulsion)).

The United States Navy has also used escort aircraft carriers (CVE) and airship aircraft carriers (ZRS). In addition, various amphibious warfare ships (LHA, LHD, LPH, and to a lesser degree LPD and LSD classes) can operate as carriers. All of these classes of ships have their own lists and so are not included here.

Historical overview
The first aircraft carrier commissioned into the United States Navy was USS Langley (CV-1) on 20 March 1922. These classes made up the entirety of the United States carrier fleet active prior to the Second World War.

Between these two classes, 35 ships were completed. During this time, the Navy also purchased two training vessels, USS Wolverine and USS Sable, which were given the unclassified miscellaneous (IX) hull designation.

One more class in the start of the Cold War, the United States-class, was canceled due to the Truman administration's policy of shrinking the United States Navy and in particular, the Navy's air assets. The policy was eventually revised after a public outcry and Congressional hearings sparked by the Revolt of the Admirals.

List
Keys

Training ships
During World War II, the United States Navy purchased two Great Lakes side-wheel paddle steamers and converted them into freshwater aircraft carrier training ships. Both vessels were designated with the hull classification symbol IX and lacked hangar decks, elevators or armaments. The role of these ships was for the training of pilots for carrier take-offs and landings. Together the Sable and Wolverine trained 17,820 pilots in 116,000 carrier landings. Of these, 51,000 landings were on Sable.

Aircraft carrier museums
National Museum of the United States Navy – Aircraft carrier museums

See also

 Escort carrier
 List of amphibious warfare ships
 List of aircraft carriers
 List of aircraft carriers by configuration
 List of aircraft carriers in service
 List of aircraft carriers of World War II
 List of current ships of the United States Navy
 List of escort carriers of the United States Navy
 List of ships of World War II
 List of sunken aircraft carriers
 List of US Navy ships sunk or damaged in action during World War II § Aircraft carriers (CV)
 Naval Inactive Ship Maintenance Facility
 Seaplane tender/seaplane carrier
 Timeline for aircraft carrier service
 Timeline of aircraft carriers of the United States Navy

References

External links
 MaritimeQuest US Aircraft Carrier Index
 The Lost American Aircraftcarriers

Museum ships
 USS Hornet (CV-12) - USS Hornet Museum, Alameda, CA
 USS Intrepid (CV-11) - Intrepid Sea, Air & Space Museum, New York, NY
 USS Lexington (CV-16) - USS Lexington Museum On the Bay, Corpus Christi, TX
 USS Midway (CV-41) - USS Midway Museum, San Diego, CA
 USS Yorktown (CV-10) - Patriots Point, Mount Pleasant, SC

 
United States
Aircraft carriers